Poranguí is a world music multi-instrumentalist known for solo improvisational live looping. Born in São José dos Campos, Brazil, he grew up in the cultures of Brazil (his mother), Mexico (his father), and the southwestern United States. He currently resides in Sedona, Arizona.

Education and teaching
After high school, Poranguí spent a year studying in China and then teaching English through the use of music in Vietnam. Then, while on a scholarship to Duke University as a Coca-Cola Scholar, he created an interdisciplinary undergraduate major combining music, movement, and medicine, where he also earned the John Hope Franklin Student Documentary Award.

He has taught on the faculty of the Phoenix Conservatory of Music and was recognized as a Teaching Artist for the Arizona Commission on the Arts from 2008 to 2015.

Musical career
After graduating from Duke University,  Poranguí directed the ten-piece Afro-Brazilian ensemble Grupo Liberdade, from 2004 to 2017. He has also collaborated with artists such as Liquid Bloom, Shaman's Dream, and Eric Zang. In 2011, Poranguí released an EP under his label, Sol Creation, with Eric Zang, under the name Poranguí & Zang, titled Terra Sagrada.

He has performed and recorded with the BBC in London at the Jazz Cafe with Osunlade, for the PBS Singer-Songwriter Series with his ensemble Grupo Liberdade, and as a featured artist for TEDxSedona and for the  SXSW Yoga Soundscape Series. He has performed at Lightning in a Bottle Festival, Beloved Festival, Sonic Bloom Festival, Sedona Yoga Festival, Boom Festival (Portugal), and Ozora Festival (Hungary), among others.

In 2016, Poranguí collaborated with filmmakers Mitch Schultz and Aubrey Marcus on the documentary Ayahuasca, which spawned his second studio album, also titled Ayahuasca. Desert Trax released a remix version of the album in 2017. The musician released his first live album, self-titled Poranguí, on 1 March 2019, along with a guided meditation version featuring Ashley Klein. Desert Trax released two remix versions of the record in 2019, with Resueño issuing another remix version a year later. Shaman's Dream Records published Poranguí's EP Earth Keepers, another collaboration with Eric Zhang, in July 2021. In August of that year, Poranguí was remixed by Mose and released as Poranguí – Mose Remixes. In October 2021, Poranguí and Liquid Bloom released Kuya Sessions: Cura—the first installment in a four-part musical series intended for psychedelic-assisted therapy. In April 2022, Poranguí, Vylana, Aubrey Marcus, Liquid Bloom, and Eric Zang released the album Remembrance, under the collaborative name For the Good of All. This was followed by Remembrance: Soundscapes—a music-only version of the album. Later the same month, Poranguí and Liquid Bloom published Kuya Sessions: Samadhi. Kuya Sessions: Akasha came out in November of that year.

Discography

Studio albums

Collaborations / remixes / singles

References

People from Sedona, Arizona
Duke University alumni
World music musicians
People from São José dos Campos
Living people
Year of birth missing (living people)